Vivekananda Pally is a Ward of Boinchi that is located in North-west of this town.

Education
This colony has a primary school named Batika Battala Primary School.

Surroundings 
The colony is a part of Boinchi. In north, there is Momrejpur and Tailokopa(often spelled as Telkopa)
is in the west.

Festivals

Durga Puja
The main festival of this colony is Durga Puja. It is started in 2005.

Jagadhatri Puja
Jagadhatri Puja is also observed in this colony. There are four pujas in four corners of the colony. They are:
Vivekananda Smriti Sangha
Pratik Sangha
Amra Sabai
Uttarayan

Transport
Boinchi is the nearest  rail station of Vivekananda Pally. It is 1 km apart of the colony. Boinchi-Kalna Road(STATE HIGHWAY NO. 11) passes thorough the east of the colony.

Main Occupation
Most of the residents are servicemen. Some of them are businessmen. But there is no cultivators in the colony.

References
1. Boinchi

2. Hooghly District 

Hooghly district